Sven Gösta Ågren (3 August 1936 – 24 June 2020) was a Finland-Swedish author who won the Finlandia Prize in 1988 for . Gösta Ågren, who wrote his works in Swedish, praised the Gospel of Mark for its literary values and published the collection  ('The Carpenter') in reference to it. He was known for his left-wing sympathies, which can be seen in his autobiographical work concerning the rural "proletariat." His brothers Leo and Erik were also writers.

He published poems, essays and biographies. Among the literary prizes awarded to him was the Finlandia Prize for Fiction for the poetry collection  ('Here') in 1989. In his poems,  Ågren often referred to the region he was born in, Ostrobothnia, on the west coast of Finland. (Books from Finland once had t-shirts printed with a philosophical line from one of his poems: “Don’t worry, it will / never work out.” The shirts were highly popular.)

References

Selected bibliography

External links
 Ågren, Gösta in Biografiskt lexikon för Finland (in Swedish)

People from Nykarleby
Finnish writers in Swedish
1936 births
2020 deaths
Finlandia Prize winners
Swedish-speaking Finns